NEOL may refer to:
 5''-phosphoribostamycin phosphatase, an enzyme
 2'-N-acetylparomamine deacetylase, an enzyme
 2-acetyl-6-hydroxyneomycin C deacetylase, an enzyme
 Nerium oleander, a toxic plant